The India national women's squash team represents India in international squash team competitions, and is governed by the Squash Rackets Federation of India.

Since 2002, India has participated in one quarter final of the World Squash Team Open.

Current team
 Joshna Chinappa
 Dipika Pallikal
 Akanksha Salunkhe
 Tanvi Khanna
 Sunayna Kuruvilla

Results

World Team Squash Championships

Asian Squash Team Championships

See also 
Squash in India
Squash Rackets Federation of India
 India men's national squash team

References

External links 
 Team India

Squash teams
Women's national squash teams
Squash
Squash in India